Brad Watson may refer to:
 Brad Watson (ice hockey) (born 1961), National Hockey League referee
 Brad Watson (writer) (1955–2020), American writer
 Bradley C. S. Watson, Canadian-born American political science educator